Francesco Barzaghi (1839–1892) was an Italian sculptor.

Born in Milan, he had his initial training in the studios of Antonio Tantardini and a sculptor called Puttinati. He enrolled in the Accademia di Brera. Among his colleagues was  Vincenzo Vela. The sculptor Enrico Cassi was one of his pupils.

Barzaghi completed a number of monuments, including the bronze equestrian statued dedicated to Napoleon III, first unveiled in 1881 at the Exposition of Milan. He also made monuments to Luciano Manara and Garibaldi (1888). He made many marble female figures, including: 
La Frine denudata
La Mosca cieca
Silvia che si specchia (Paris Exposition 1878)
Moses saved from the Nile (Paris Exposition 1878)
L' innocenza (won a prize in Turin 1881)
Psiche
La Vanerella

References

Obtained some dates from Italian Wikipedia entry.

1839 births
1892 deaths
Artists from Milan
19th-century Italian sculptors
Italian male sculptors
19th-century Italian male artists